Darci Sprotte Neto (born March 25, 1987) is a Brazilian football player.

References

1987 births
Living people
Brazilian footballers
J1 League players
Joinville Esporte Clube players
Ventforet Kofu players
Clube Atlético Metropolitano players
Fluminense FC players
Association football midfielders